Thomas Carl Torsten Åkerberg (born 28 May 1959) is a Swedish fencer. He competed in the individual and team foil events at the 1988 Summer Olympics.

References

External links
 

1959 births
Living people
Swedish male foil fencers
Olympic fencers of Sweden
Fencers at the 1988 Summer Olympics
Sportspeople from Stockholm